ONS BOSO Sneek is a Dutch football club from Sneek, playing in the Derde Divisie.

Club history

20th century: Foundation and move 
Oranje Nassau Sneek was founded on 4 April 1932 and initially played its matches at the Sportpark Leeuwarderweg. In 1973 it moved to Zuidersportpark.

21st century: Hoofdklasse and Derde Divisie

2000s: Hoofdklasse years
In 2004 ONS became champions of the Eerste Klasse C in the Netherlands, and was promoted to the Zaterdag hoofdklasse C. After two years in the league, the club won the championship of that league on 22 April 2006, beating the Drachtster Boys in direct competition, after SC Genemuiden lost its final match of the season, and failed to secure three points to win the title. In May 2009 ONS Sneed was relegated to the Eerste Klasse, however it was promoted again after just one season, playing the 2011/12 season in the Dutch Hoofdklasse.

In 2008 the club started cooperation with the professional side SC Cambuur. Sandor van der Heide joined ONS from SC Cambuur and serves as assistant manager since 2010.

2010s: Derde Divisie years
In 2012 the club terminated its working relationship with SC Cambuur, and entered a four-year partnership with Eredivisie club SC Heerenveen.

On 1 July 2012 the club changed its name to ONS BOSO Sneek, but it remains widely known as ONS Sneek.

On 25 September 2012, ONS Sneek qualified for the third round of the KNVB Cup, beating SBV Excelsior from Rotterdam 5–4 on penalties, after the match ended in a 1–1 draw, facing Dutch giants AFC Ajax at home in the third round of the Dutch Cup.

Current squad 
As of 1 February 2016

References

Sneek
Football clubs in Súdwest-Fryslân
Football clubs in the Netherlands
1932 establishments in the Netherlands
Association football clubs established in 1932